Sectéra is a family of secure voice and data communications products made by General Dynamics Mission Systems which are approved by the United States National Security Agency. Devices in the family can use either the National Institute of Standards and Technology (NIST) Advanced Encryption Standard (AES) or SCIP to provide Type-1 encryption, with communication levels classified up to Top Secret. The devices are activated with a Personal Identification Number (PIN).

Sectéra Secure Module
The Sectéra Secure Module is a device that can provide encryption of both voice and data. It is used in the Sectéra Wireline Terminal for use with standard PSTN devices and has been incorporated into a slim module to use with a Motorola GSM cell phone.  The module is placed between the battery and the body of the phone. The phone may be used as a regular GSM phone when the security module is not activated by the PIN.

Sectéra Edge
Another member of the Sectéra family, Sectéra Edge, is a smart phone that supports both classified and unclassified voice and data communication, including access to the SIPRNET. The Sectéra Edge costs approximately US$3,000.

The Sectéra Edge was developed by General Dynamics competing against a product by L-3 under an $18 million contract from the National Security Agency. 

It was reported in 2009, that the Sectéra Edge could be the device to replace the BlackBerry of President Barack Obama in order to provide him with secure communications. But instead of the Sectéra Edge, a standard BlackBerry device was secured with the SecurVoice encryption software.

The Sectéra Edge was discontinued in 2015.

References

External links
Product Details - Sectéra

Encryption devices
General Dynamics Mission Systems